Jillian Brothers (born May 20, 1983 as Jill Mouzar [pronounced "MOW-zer"]) is a Canadian curler. Brothers was born in Liverpool, Nova Scotia and now resides in Bedford, Nova Scotia. She currently plays second on Team Andrea Kelly out of New Brunswick.

Career
Brothers started curling in Liverpool, Nova Scotia. Her first Nova Scotia junior championship was in 2001, along with Meaghan Smart, Meghan MacAdams, Carolyn Marshall, and coach Albert Smart. This team was the first Liverpool team to curl at the national level since 1970, representing Nova Scotia at the 2001 Canadian Junior Curling Championships.

In 2004, Brothers curled with Paige Mattie, Blisse Comstock, Chloe Comstock, and coach Donalda Mattie and went on to win the Canadian Junior Women's championship.  That team won the silver medal at world junior championships in Trois-Rivières, Québec.

In 2005 Brothers' women's team finished fourth out of eight teams at Nova Scotia women's championships in her first year of eligibility.

Brothers won her first provincial women's championship in 2007 and represented Nova Scotia at the Scotties Tournament of Hearts in Lethbridge, Alberta with teammates Meredith Harrison, Teri Lake, and Hayley Clarke. They finished with a 3-8 record.

Brothers played lead for Nova Scotia (skipped by Mark Dacey) at the 2010 Canadian Mixed Curling Championship, an event which she won.

In 2010, Brothers moved to Ontario and begun playing for Kirsten Wall as the team's lead. In 2012, the team broke up, and Wall left the rink, and Brothers was promoted from lead to skip. Brothers qualified for her first Ontario provincial in 2013. Following the season, Brothers moved back to Nova Scotia to play third for Heather Smith, for whom she played two seasons. The team won the 2014 Nova Scotia Scotties Tournament of Hearts, and represented Nova Scotia at the 2014 Scotties Tournament of Hearts. There, Smith led the team to a 4-7 record. Smith left the team in 2015, and Brothers took over as skip. Brothers won the 2016 Nova Scotia Scotties Tournament of Hearts, and led Nova Scotia to a 6-5 record at the 2016 Scotties Tournament of Hearts. Brothers would not win another provincial until 2019. She led her Nova Scotia team on home ice at the 2019 Scotties Tournament of Hearts, but were eliminated after pool play, finishing with a 2-5 record.

The 2021 Nova Scotia Scotties was cancelled due to the COVID-19 pandemic in Nova Scotia, so the Nova Scotia Curling Association appointed Brothers and her team to represent the province at the 2021 Scotties Tournament of Hearts, as the 2020 provincial champion Mary-Anne Arsenault moved to British Columbia. One member of the Brothers rink, Sarah Murphy opted to not attend the Scotties, with lead Jenn Brine moving up to second and alternate Emma Logan moving up to play lead. At the Tournament of Hearts, Brothers led team Nova Scotia to a 3–5 record, failing to make it to the championship round.

Personal life
Brothers is employed as a hair stylist at Dime Salon. She is married to Paul Brothers and has two children.

Grand Slam record

Former events

References

External links

1983 births
Living people
Canadian mixed curling champions
Canadian people of German descent
Canadian women curlers
Curlers from Nova Scotia
Curlers from Ontario
People from Bedford, Nova Scotia
People from Queens County, Nova Scotia
Sportspeople from Halifax, Nova Scotia